Founded in July 1985, the Energy Research Institute of the Russian Academy of Sciences (ERIRAS) was originally an outgrowth of the general energy department at Institute for High Temperatures RAS (IVTAN).  The staff at the newly formed organization comprised professionals gathered from other scientific organizations.  At the time of its creation, ERIRAS' challenge was to develop the basic content and quantitative substantiation for the Energy Program of the USSR.  The first director of ERIRAS was Lev Aleksandrovich Milentyev, an Academician of the Russian Academy of Sciences.  At present, Academician Aleksei Aleksandrovich Makarov is the director of the Institute.

Organization 
The Institute employs approximately 80 staff members, of whom 65% are highly skilled specialists.  It comprises eight scientific departments:

Laboratory for the study of the interconnections between economics and energy
Laboratory for the study of the improvement of energy consumption and energy savings
Laboratory for the modeling of energy markets
Laboratory for research on the methodology of energy policy development 
Laboratory for the study of the regulation and development of oil and gas systems
Laboratory for the study of the regulation and development of electricity and heat systems
Laboratory for the study of the regulation and development of the coal industry
Centre for the study of international energy markets

The Institute deploys a matrix organizational structure in order to maximize flexibility.  Thus, different departments can work together jointly and each can be modified according to the circumstances.

Activities 
The Institute's mission is to find solutions to a wide range of contemporary challenges including: 
efficient energy production and consumption techniques to promote energy savings; appropriate pricing mechanisms for energy markets; and legislation, tax policy and other general issues related to domestic energy policy.

ERIRAS work is divided into the following research areas:

the study of the regularities of energy development 
the modeling of energy development
the theory and methods of energy system studies 
the creation of a scientific basis for energy policy and the mechanisms for its implementation 
the identification of the rational spheres and magnitudes of energy savings, and the mechanisms for energy saving policy implementation which take into consideration environmental concerns
the study of the priorities in energy technical policy
the identification of rational mechanisms for the regulation of energy development within a market framework, including primary legislation, pricing techniques, and tax and investment policy
the forecasting of energy markets
the creation of a scientific basis for the development of the oil & gas industry
the creation of a scientific basis for the development of the energy sectors (electricity & heat)
the creation of a scientific basis for the development of the coal industry

The Institute's work is based on complex mathematical modeling, a unique database, and advanced computer technologies.

Today, ERIRAS is a major scientific center that is at the forefront of fundamental and applied research.  The knowledge produced by ERIRAS provides the basis for energy development forecasting and policy in Russia, the CIS, and for international energy markets.

References

External links 
Official site of ERIRAS

Systems thinking
Climate change organizations
Environmental research institutes
Institutes of the Russian Academy of Sciences
Energy research institutes
Research institutes in the Soviet Union
Research institutes established in 1985
1985 establishments in the Soviet Union